Vivian Sevenich (born 28 February 1993) is a Dutch water polo player for UVSE and the Dutch national team.

She participated at the 2018 Women's European Water Polo Championship.

See also
 List of World Aquatics Championships medalists in water polo

References

External links
 

1993 births
Living people
Dutch female water polo players
Expatriate water polo players
Dutch expatriate sportspeople in Hungary
Water polo players at the 2020 Summer Olympics
Olympic water polo players of the Netherlands
World Aquatics Championships medalists in water polo
21st-century Dutch women